Khabib is an alternate spelling of Habib, an Arabic surname.

It may refer to:

Khabib Nurmagomedov, (born 1988) Russian mixed martial artist
Khabib Allakhverdiev, (born 1982) Russian boxer
Khabib Ilyaletdinov, (born 1965) Russian footballer
Khabib Sharipov, Russian pop singer, known by the mononym Khabib (ХАБИБ)  
Khabib Syukron (born 1988) Indonesian footballer

See also
"Khabib", 2019 song by Capital Bra
Habib, disambiguation